El Arte del Sabor (literally The Art of Flavor) is a jazz album by the Bebo Valdés Trio released in 2001 by Blue Note Records. It was recorded and mixed in New York's Current Sounds studios during March 2000. The album features Bebo Valdés on piano, Cachao on double bass, and Carlos "Patato" Valdés on congas. In addition, alto saxophonist Paquito D'Rivera appears as a guest artist in three tracks. The album won the 2002 Latin Grammy Award for Best Traditional Tropical Album as well as the Grammy Award for Best Traditional Tropical Latin Album.

Background and recording
El Arte del Sabor is Bebo Valdés' third album in his "second career". After remaining mostly inactive since the 1960s, when he defected from Cuba and settled in Stockholm, Valdés experienced a career revival in 1994 with the recording of Bebo Rides Again, which was followed by Recuerdos de Habana, recorded between 1998 and 2000. For this recording, Valdés worked with two of Cuba's most experienced musicians living in exile: double bassist Israel López, better known as Cachao, and conguero Carlos Valdés, better known as Patato. In addition, alto saxophone and clarinet player Paquito D'Rivera, who had collaborated with Valdés in Bebo Rides Again, played on three tracks as a "special guest".

Like his previous albums, and even more so, this album presented a jazz approach to many Cuban classics from a variety of genres including bolero ("Bolero potpourrí", "Romance en La Habana"), son cubano ("Son de la loma", "El reloj de Pastora"), conga ("Conga potpourrí"), guaracha ("Pare cochero", " Guaracha potpourrí") and afro ("Ogguere"). All the tracks were recorded between March 13 and March 16, 2000 in Current Sounds studios in New York. This was Valdés first collaboration with producer Nat Chediak, who would continue to work with Valdés for the rest of his career.

Critical reception 

El Arte del Sabor has received generally positive reviews. Jazz critic Scott Yanow called the album "a gem", highlighting its "charming melodies, subtle interplay, and wonderful playing". Jim Josselyn writing for All About Jazz described the album as "intellectual enough to satisfy musicians and accessible enough for casual listeners and dancers to enjoy" and praised the musicians as "masters of their instruments and Latin jazz".

Awards
The album won the 2002 Latin Grammy Award for Best Traditional Tropical Album as well as the Grammy Award for Best Traditional Tropical Latin Album at the 45th Annual Grammy Awards. It was the first of Valdés' three Grammys.

Track listing

Personnel
Bebo Valdés Trio
Bebo Valdés - piano
Israel López "Cachao" - double bass
Carlos "Patato" Valdés - congas, percussion

Special guest
Paquito D'Rivera - alto saxophone, clarinet (tracks 5, 10, 15)
Production
Nat Chediak - producer
Julio Martí - executive producer
Catherine Miller - sound engineer, mixer
Todd Gerard - mastering engineer

References

External links 
El Arte del Sabor, Discogs.
El arte del sabor, Rate Your Music.

2001 albums
Bebo Valdés albums
Afro-Cuban jazz albums
Blue Note Records albums
Latin Grammy Award for Best Traditional Tropical Album
Grammy Award for Best Tropical Latin Album